The women's hammer throw at the 2012 European Athletics Championships was held at the Helsinki Olympic Stadium on 29 June and 1 July.

Medalists

Records

Schedule

Results

Qualification
Qualification: Qualification Performance 71.00 (Q) or at least 12 best performers advance to the final

Final

References

Qualification Results
Final Results
Full results

Hammer Throw
Hammer throw at the European Athletics Championships
2012 in women's athletics